Venusia semistrigata is a moth in the family Geometridae first described by Hugo Theodor Christoph in 1881. It is found in Russia and Japan.

The wingspan is 17–22 mm.

Subspecies
Venusia semistrigata semistrigata (Russian Far East, Japan)
Venusia semistrigata expressa Inoue, 1963 (Japan)

References

Moths described in 1881
Venusia (moth)
Moths of Japan